Thomas Jean William Blankenburg (September 2, 1909 – March 29, 1979) was an American competition swimmer who represented the United States as an 18-year-old at the 1928 Summer Olympics in Amsterdam, The Netherlands.  Blankenburg advanced to the semifinals of the men's 200-meter breaststroke and placed ninth overall in the final standings.

Blankenburg later attended the University of Oregon.  He qualified as a member of the U.S. swimming team for the 1932 Summer Olympics, but was disqualified as a "professional" when it was disclosed that he had worked as lifeguard.

See also
 List of University of Oregon alumni

References

External links
 Thomas Blankenburg at OlympianDatabase.com

1909 births
1979 deaths
American male breaststroke swimmers
Lifeguards
Olympic swimmers of the United States
Sportspeople from Spokane, Washington
Swimmers at the 1928 Summer Olympics
University of Oregon alumni